is a Japanese film director.

Filmography
Pray (2005)
Simsons (ja) (2006)
Kisaragi (2007)
Guardian Angel (ja) (2009)
A Man on the Verge at a Black Company (ja) (2009)
Strawberry Night (2013)
Poison Berry in My Brain (2015)
Kasane: Beauty and Fate (2018)
You, I Love (2018)
The Master Plan (2021)
City Hunter (2024)

References

1962 births
Japanese film directors
Living people
People from Tokyo